Several ships have been named :

 , a Kusu-class patrol frigate of the Japan Maritime Self-Defense Force, formerly USS Pasco (PF-6)

See also 
 Kashi Maru, a Japanese auxiliary minelayer/merchant ship during World War II
 Kashi (disambiguation)
 Kasi (disambiguation)

Imperial Japanese Navy ship names
Japanese Navy ship names